Vick Ballard (born July 16, 1990) is a former American football running back. He played college football at Mississippi State, and was selected by the Indianapolis Colts 170th overall in the 2012 NFL Draft.

College career
Ballard attended Mississippi Gulf Coast Community College in 2008 and 2009. Prior to 2010, he transferred to Mississippi State University. In his two years at Mississippi State, he rushed for 2,157 yards on 379 carries and 29 touchdowns. He was named NCJAA 1st Team All-American.

Despite playing only two seasons, he is third on the Mississippi State career rushing touchdowns list, and his 19 touchdowns in 2010 are a school single-season record.

Professional career

Indianapolis Colts
During the NFL Scouting Combine, Ballard tripped during the 40 yard dash and ran into the timer. On his second attempt, Ballard ran a 4.65 time, ranking 16th out of the 25 running backs.

Ballard was drafted by the Indianapolis Colts on April 28, 2012.  His first game as a starting running back was played October 14, 2012 against the New York Jets. On October 28, 2012, he caught a pass from Andrew Luck and took it 16 yards for his first career touchdown. Ballard, under pressure from several defensive players, leapt and corkscrewed in mid air as he crossed the goal line. Ballard's score was the game winner in overtime against the Tennessee Titans. On December 16, 2012, Ballard rushed for a career-high 105 yards on 18 carries in a loss to the Houston Texans.

On September 13, 2013, head coach Chuck Pagano confirmed Ballard was placed on injured reserve with a torn ACL, and as a result missed all but one game in the 2013 season.

On July 25, 2014, Ballard was carted off the practice field due to an apparent ankle injury. An MRI revealed that Ballard tore his Achilles tendon, which caused him to miss the full 2014 season.

On September 15, 2015, the Colts placed Ballard on waivers. Ballard cleared waivers and reverted to the Colts roster on injured reserve. The Colts and Ballard reached an injury settlement on September 22, making him a free agent.

New Orleans Saints
On February 3, 2016, Ballard signed a reserve/future contract with the New Orleans Saints. On May 9, Ballard was released by the team.

NFL career statistics

Regular season

Postseason

References

External links
Mississippi State Bulldogs bio

1990 births
Living people
People from Pascagoula, Mississippi
Players of American football from Mississippi
American football running backs
Mississippi Gulf Coast Bulldogs football players
Mississippi State Bulldogs football players
Indianapolis Colts players